Anargemus is a genus of flies in the family Stratiomyidae.

Species
Anargemus basalis Lindner, 1965

References

Stratiomyidae
Brachycera genera
Taxa named by Erwin Lindner
Diptera of Africa